Larentia is a genus of moths in the family Geometridae first described by Treitschke in 1825.

Species
 Larentia clavaria (Haworth, 1809) – mallow
 Larentia malvata (Rambur, [1833])

References

Larentiini